Niels Gustav Meyn (born 11 December 1891 in Copenhagen, died 15 April 1957 in Gentofte), was a Danish writer.

Family

Meyn's father was a pharmacist and an operations manager at the Carlsberg Brewery. His mother was an officer's daughter from the German family von Kohl.

Meyn had a son, Hans Ole Nissen Weller, by Ebba Lili (Mickey) Weller but was never married and never officially listed as Ole's father. He did, however, have contact with his son throughout his life.

Literary career

Meyn debuted in 1910, the same year he completed his schooling, with a short story in the newspaper Hjemmet. In 1911 he started a degree in natural sciences, never completed, and in the same year he published his first novel, co-written with August Klingsey, Med luftskib til Mars. His own first solo-written novel was Rejsen til Venus, published in 1915.

Before becoming a professional fiction-writer, Meyn worked for a while for the East Asiatic Company, and from 1917-19 for Politikens lejebibliotek. As a journalist he wrote hundreds of articles for various journals, mainly on popular science topics.

Meyn had started as a translator for Litteraturselskabet in the first decade of the 1900s, but had not worked there long before he discovered that it was quicker to write stories himself than to translate them. It was, however, his route into the pulp fiction industry that flourished in the early twentieth century, and he contributed to many of the Litteraturselsskabet's series that otherwise mostly consisted of translations.

Before his death in the mid-1950s, Meyn wrote more than 300 crime stories, counting the many pulp-fiction stories he published. In addition Meyn wrote under more than 30 different pseudonyms, among them George Griffith, Harold Chester, Rex Nelson, David Gartner, Gustav Hardner and, the best known and most used, Charles Bristol. This enabled him to publish his stories at the same furious rate as he produced them. He also wrote anonymously. Sometimes, needing money, Meyn sold the ideas for stories to others for them to finish writing. His output included children's books, science fiction, animal books and nonfiction.

Meyn wrote for money, but was not without literary ambitions---but never succeeded in gaining acceptance as a literary author, since in Denmark popular literature was looked down on, at least until the early 1980s. Meyn had a more prominent position in Sweden than in Denmark.

Lord Kingsley and Fyrst Basil were among his first contributions to the crime genre. Later he contributed stories to some of the main Danish pulp fiction magazine, inter alia under the pseudonym Peter Anker: Betjent Ole Ny, Kurt Danner and Styrmand Rasmussen. Most central is his own series about 'Mystiske Mr. X.', which came out in several parts.

Meyn also wrote longer novels, published under various pseudonyms (including Gustav Hardner, Harold Chester, Richard Ørn). Although Meyn often used motifs associated with adventure stories at a time when the crime novel was generally leaning towards logic and science, or the morality of the hardboiled private detective, his novels often had more substance than the more stereotyped detective stories in magazines.

The part of Meyn's writing on which he himself put the highest value was his books about animals---fiction, but based on thorough knowledge of animal behavior---which were published throughout Scandinavia. Some were translated into German and published in Germany or Austria.

Most Danish and Swedish children in first half of the 1900s probably read something by Niels Meyn. His main pseudonyms as a children's author were Anne Lykke and Christel Marner, when he wrote for girls, and Charles Bristol, Erik Juul or Kai Lynres when he wrote for boys. He mostly wrote books for boys and many of them contain a mixture of adventure and fantastic.

In many ways Meyn had a more prominent position in Sweden, where John Lorén published many of his stories, including most of the series with Jack Lester in Alibimagasinet. Meyn's death in 1957 was mentioned in several Swedish newspapers, but hardly at all in Denmark. John Lorén's obituary called Meyn "a brilliant writer", adding that "through his Jack Lester novels, which we had the privilege to publish, he has been very much appreciated by our readers."

Nazi sympathies

Meyn joined the National Socialist Workers' Party of Denmark in 1940 and became an employee of their daily Fædrelandet. His literary contribution to the National Socialist Danish literature is however rather modest, although in the DNSAP's Maanedsbreve one can find individual stories that very clearly reflect a National Socialist influence. For example, the short story 'Elfenbensviften' both structurally and thematically is one of the purest examples of the trends in the Danish National Socialist literature.

Meyn came into conflict with the party towards the end of the war and withdrew. Nothing indicates that he was an active Nazi. Although his stories are often based on literary stereotypes and populist prejudices, they are no different from what other writers wrote during the interwar period. Meyn's Nazi associations meant that he never regained quite the position he had enjoyed before the War, although a few years after the war he did become a member of the Dansk Forfatterforening.

Pseudonyms used by Niels Meyn

Peter Anker, Ellinor Bell, Patricia Bennett, Mary Bright, Charles Bristol, Harold Chester, Dick Danner, Jan Dorph, Phil Farwest, John D. Forster, Davis Gartner, George Griffith, Mary Hamilton, Gustav Harder, Carl Hardner, Gustav Hardner, Lisa Hill, Richard H. Hill, Richard M. Hill, Else Jensen, Erik Juul, Ole Klindt, Anne Lykke, Kai Lynæs, John Marling, Christel Marner, Ann Marshall, Jan Miller, James Morris, Jens Munk, Nikolaj Møller, Rex Nelson, David Parker, Ruth Parker, Andreas Rasmussen, Robert Sterling, Erik Tønder, Lili Werner, Richard Ørn.

References

Sources
 Niels Meyn-biografi, accessed 2012-08-05
 Per Hougaard, "Om knaldromaner, føljetoner og kolportagelitteratur i Danmark", s. 7-37 i: Lotte Philipson m.fl. (red.), Bøger, samlinger, historier - En antologi, Det Kongelige Bibliotek, 1999. .
 Ole Ravn, Dansk nationalsocialistisk litteratur 1930-1945, Berlingske Forlag, 1979, s. 246-250.

1891 births
1957 deaths
Danish male writers
Danish collaborators with Nazi Germany